Luzulaspis is a genus of true bugs belonging to the family Coccidae.

The species of this genus are found in Europe and Northern America.

Species:
 Luzulaspis americana Koteja & Howell, 1979 
 Luzulaspis bisetosa Borchsenius, 1952

References

Coccidae